The Focke-Wulf Super Lorin was a proposed German jet interceptor project. Designed towards the end of World War II by engineer Heinz von Halen, the project remained only a factory design exercise, and never received an RLM airframe number before the surrender of Nazi Germany.

Development
Little is known about this project apart from brief mention in surviving documents; it was designed around the same time as the Focke-Wulf Ta 283. The Super Lorin was based on the Focke-Wulf Ta 183, with similar mid-fuselage positioned wings swept at 45°.

The aircraft would have a wingspan of 7.6 m and a length of 11.6 m. Power was to be provided by a fuselage-mounted rocket engine and small turbojet for takeoff; two Lorin ramjets located on the tips of the sharply swept tailplane would be used for cruising. The rocket and turbojet would provide enough initial velocity to start the ramjet engines which cannot produce thrust at zero or low airspeed. Armament was to have been two 30 mm (1.18 in) MK 108 cannon.

See also

References

Super Lorin
Abandoned military aircraft projects of Germany
Aircraft with auxiliary rocket engines
Ramjet-powered aircraft
World War II fighter aircraft of Germany
Twinjets